The 119th Infantry (The Mooltan Regiment) was an infantry regiment of the British Indian Army. The regiment originated in 1817, when it was raised as the 1st Battalion, 10th Regiment of Bombay Native Infantry.

The regiment's first action was in the Battle of Ghazni in the First Afghan War. After Afghanistan it took part in the Siege of Multan in the Second Anglo-Sikh War. It returned to Afghanistan in the Second Afghan War and took part in the Siege of Multan. During World War I it was attached to the 6th (Poona) Division and served in the Mesopotamian campaign. It fought in the Battle of Basra, the Battle of Qurna, the Battle of Es Sinn before suffering a setback at the Battle of Ctesiphon, after which it withdrew to Kut. Trapped in the city in the Siege of Kut the regiment was forced to surrender after 147 days. A second battalion was raised from men on leave and reinforcements, and sent to Mesopotamia.

After World War I the Indian government reformed the army moving from single-battalion to multi-battalion regiments. In 1922 the 119th Infantry (The Molten Regiment) became the 2nd (Mooltan Battalion), The 9th Jat Regiment. After independence it was one of the regiments allocated to the Indian Army.

Predecessor names
1st Battalion, 10th Regiment of Bombay Native Infantry – 1817-1824
19th Regiment of Bombay Native Infantry – 1824-1885
19th Bombay Infantry (The Mooltan Regiment) – 1885-1903
119th Infantry (The Mooltan Regiment) - 1903-1922
2nd (Mooltan) Battalion, The 9th JAT Regiment - 1922-1947

References

Sources and further reading

British Indian Army infantry regiments
Bombay Presidency
Military units and formations established in 1817
Military units and formations disestablished in 1922